Fyr or FYR may refer to:
 Former Yugoslav Republic of Macedonia (now North Macedonia)
 Fyr Channel, an Antarctic strait in the South Orkney Islands
 "FYR", a 2001 song on Feminist Sweepstakes by Le Tigre
 FYR, an email subject abbreviation for

See also 
 Fyre (disambiguation)
 FRY (disambiguation)